Karl Alber (born 17 September 1948) is a German former footballer and politician.

Alber made 32 appearances in the 2. Bundesliga for Eintracht Bad Kreuznach during his playing career. He later became the mayor of Erlenbach, Baden-Württemberg, serving from 1986 until his retirement from politics in 2010.

References

External links 
 

1948 births
Living people
People from Heilbronn (district)
Sportspeople from Stuttgart (region)
German footballers
Association football midfielders
2. Bundesliga players
Mayors of places in Baden-Württemberg
Christian Democratic Union of Germany politicians
Footballers from Baden-Württemberg